The UCI Mountain Bike Marathon World Championships is the world championship event for marathon mountain bike races. Inaugurated by the Union Cycliste Internationale in 2003, the event is held annually in single classes for men and women. The 2003 event was organized as part of the UCI Mountain Bike & Trials World Championships.  Subsequent marathon world championships, however, have been organised as a stand-alone event.

The UCI awards a gold medal and a rainbow jersey to the winner. Silver and bronze medals are awarded to the second and third place contestants. World champions wear their rainbow jersey until the following year's championship, but only in marathon events.

Medalists

Men

Medal count

Women

Medal count

See also
UCI Mountain Bike & Trials World Championships

References

External links

Mountain biking events
Mountain Bike Marathon World Championships

Recurring sporting events established in 2003